Sun Qibin (born 6 November 1991) is a Chinese footballer who currently plays for Tianjin Quanjian in the Chinese Super League.

Club career
Sun Qibin started his professional football career in 2010 when he was promoted to Chinese Super League side Chongqing Lifan's first team squad using name Han Xi. Failing to establish himself within the first team, Sun joined China League Two side Dalian Transcendence in 2014 and moved to Jingtie Locomotive in 2016. On 23 April 2016, Sun made his senior debut in a 2–0 away win over Jiangsu Yancheng Dingli.

Sun joined Chinese Super League newcomer Tianjin Quanjian in 2017 after Jingtie Locomotive withdrew from professional league system. He failed to register for official matches of Tianjin due to lack of transfer quota. Sun was promoted to the first team in 2018. On 18 April 2018, he made his debut for the club in the last group match of 2018 AFC Champions League which Tianjin Quanjian beat Kashiwa Reysol 3–2.

Career statistics
.

References

External links

1991 births
Living people
Chinese footballers
People from Jining
Footballers from Shandong
Chongqing Liangjiang Athletic F.C. players
Dalian Transcendence F.C. players
Tianjin Tianhai F.C. players
China League One players
Chinese Super League players
Association football goalkeepers